William Herbert John Walker  (born 23 February 1942 in Huntly, New Zealand) is a former Australian rules footballer who represented  in the West Australian National Football League (WANFL). He was the winner of the 1965, 1966, 1967 and 1970 Sandover Medals.

Career
Born in Huntly, New Zealand, Walker grew up in the wheatbelt town of Narembeen. Despite being regarded as perhaps the best country prospect in Western Australia in 1960, Walker’s father thought him too small to be successful at WANFL football.

Playing in the grand final in his first season in 1961, Walker kicked 5.5, including the decisive goal, and went on to play in winning grand finals in the next two seasons. He is the only player to have won four Sandover Medals, although his 1970 medal, which had previously been lost on countback to Pat Dalton, was awarded retrospectively by Westar Rules in 1997. Walker had to be coaxed into playing again for each of three seasons after 1965 owing to his farm work and managing a Midland Junction hotel, but it was in this period that Walker reached his peak for a Swan Districts team that was struggling severely owing to the lack of ruckmen of even moderate ability. Between 1969 and 1971 Walker captain-coached Swans with very little success, but his experience was valuable as the black and whites climbed the ladder under Jack Ensor in the following four seasons – during which their scarcity of ruckmen turned into a glut as such future VFL players as Bob Beecroft and Garry Sidebottom joined.

Walker served on Swan Districts’ Board of Directors from 1978 to 1983, and was appointed president of the club in 1983, a role in which he served until 1995. He was appointed a Member of the Order of Australia in 1978 and life membership of the WAFL in 1985. In 1996 Walker was an inaugural inductee into the Australian Football Hall of Fame and in 2004 he was awarded Legend Status in the West Australian Football Hall of Fame. His son, Greg Walker, played 139 games for Swan Districts, winning the 1990 Simpson Medal.

References 

 
 AFL: Hall of Fame

1942 births
Living people
All-Australians (1953–1988)
Australian Football Hall of Fame inductees
Australian rules footballers from Western Australia
People from the Wheatbelt (Western Australia)
Sportspeople from Huntly, New Zealand
Sandover Medal winners
Swan Districts Football Club administrators
Swan Districts Football Club coaches
Swan Districts Football Club players
West Australian Football Hall of Fame inductees
Members of the Order of Australia